Chantelle Graham (born 25 November 1995) is an Australian professional rugby league footballer. She previously played for the Newcastle Knights in the NRL Women's Premiership.

Background
Graham was born in Newcastle, New South Wales. She grew up playing league tag, touch football and Oztag.

Playing career

Early years
In 2015, Graham played for the Wyong Roos league tag team. In 2017 and 2018, she played for the South Newcastle Lions in the Newcastle Rugby League. She also spent time playing for the Aberglasslyn Ants. In 2019, she represented the CRL Newcastle and Central Coast Roosters sides. In 2020, she represented the Newcastle and Hunter side in the Women's Country Championships. In 2021, she played for the Newcastle Maitland Region Knights representative side. In November 2021, she joined the Newcastle Knights' inaugural NRLW squad. In December 2021, she received the Country Women's Player of the Year award.

2022
In round 5 of the delayed 2021 NRL Women's season, Graham made her NRLW debut for the Knights against the Gold Coast Titans. She played in 1 match for the Knights, before parting ways with the club at the end of the season.

References

External links
Newcastle Knights profile

1995 births
Living people
Australian female rugby league players
Newcastle Knights (NRLW) players
Rugby league second-rows
Rugby league locks
Rugby league players from Newcastle, New South Wales
South Newcastle Lions players
Wyong Roos players